Mullah Abdul Majeed Akhund (ملا عبدالمجید اخند) is an Afghan Taliban politician. He is the current Acting Minister of Martyrs and Disabled Affairs since 4 October 2021.

References

Year of birth missing (living people)
Living people
Taliban government ministers of Afghanistan